Tlogob is a rural locality (a selo) and the administrative centre of Tlogobsky Selsoviet, Gunibsky District, Republic of Dagestan, Russia. The population was 215 as of 2010.

Geography 
Tlogob is located 41 km northwest of Gunib (the district's administrative centre) by road, on the Kudiyabor River. Zazilkala and Gazilala are the nearest rural localities.

Nationalities 
Avars live there.

References 

Rural localities in Gunibsky District